The 1908 Kentucky State College Blue and White football team was an American football team that represented Kentucky State College (now known as the University of Kentucky) as an independent during the 1908 college football season. In its third season under head coach J. White Guyn, the team compiled a 4–3 record.

Schedule

References

Kentucky State College
Kentucky Wildcats football seasons
Kentucky State College Blue and White football